James Bolivar diGriz, alias "Slippery Jim" and "The Stainless Steel Rat", is a fictional character and a series of comic science fiction novels written by Harry Harrison.

Description
James Bolivar diGriz goes by many aliases, including "Slippery Jim" and "The Stainless Steel Rat". He is a futuristic con man, thief, and all-round rascal. He is charming and quick-witted. He is also a master of disguise and martial arts, an accomplished bank robber, a criminal mastermind, an expert on breaking and entering, and (perhaps most usefully) a skilled liar. Master of self-rationalization, the Rat frequently justifies his crimes by arguing that he is providing society with entertainment; and besides which, he only steals from institutions that he believes have insurance coverage and so will be able to recoup their losses. He displays a strong sense of morality, albeit in a much more restricted sense than is traditional. For example, diGriz will steal without compunction, but deplores killing.

The character was introduced in Harrison's short story "The Stainless Steel Rat", first published in 1957 in Astounding magazine. The story introduces the Rat, who has just carried out a successful larceny operation, and subsequently details a complex bank robbery the Rat pulls off with ease; however, he is outfoxed by the mysterious "Special Corps" — a crime-fighting organization staffed with former criminals — and recruited by them in order to fight crime. Harrison used the story, with minor modifications, as the introduction to the series's first full-length novel, also called The Stainless Steel Rat. Like other characters created by Harrison, the Rat is a speaker of Esperanto and advocates atheism.

Books
There are 12 works in the Stainless Steel Rat series.

 The Adventures of the Stainless Steel Rat (1978) anthologized the first three books: 
 The Stainless Steel Rat Omnibus (2008) anthologized the first three books:  (Gollancz)

Based on information in The Stainless Steel Rat Saves the World, it is possible to work out the timeframe of the Rat's life and adventures: James is sent 32,598 years into the past to 1975, which would place future events in and around 34,573 A.D. – although Professor Coypu also mentions that they are no longer using the Gregorian calendar. Specifics of the new calendar are never mentioned.

Spin-offs

Comics
The Stainless Steel Rat, The Stainless Steel Rat Saves the World and The Stainless Steel Rat for President were adapted into comic strip form in early issues of 2000 AD, written by Kelvin Gosnell and drawn by Carlos Ezquerra. Ezquerra drew Jim with an appearance modelled on the actor James Coburn. They appeared in the following issues of 2000 AD:

 The Stainless Steel Rat, 12 episodes, 2000 AD progs 140–151 (Nov. 1979 to Feb. 1980).
 The Stainless Steel Rat Saves the World, 12 episodes, 2000 AD progs 166–177 (June to Sep. 1980).
 The Stainless Steel Rat for President, 12 episodes, 2000 AD progs 393–404 (Nov. 1984 to Feb. 1985).

The first appearance of The Stainless Steel Rat in prog 140 was supposed to be preceded with a brief panel of explanation of who Jim was. However, an editorial error meant that the panel actually appeared at the end of the first episode, not the beginning. This prompted a letter to be printed in prog 148 from Harry Harrison himself pointing out the error, for which he won £3.

These three stories were colorized and reprinted by Eagle Comics in 1985 and 1986 as a six-issue limited series. They were also collected in a trade paperback in July 2010.

The 2000AD comic versions were collected into a paperback and hardcover edition in August 2021 which includes the colour centre spreads as they originally appeared.

Books

Gamebook
Harrison also produced a gamebook in the style of the Choose Your Own Adventure and Fighting Fantasy series, called You Can Be The Stainless Steel Rat, the reader being told that their decisions would "determine whether he or she can find Prof. Geisteskrank on the planet Skraldespand and bring him back before he activates a lethal new weapon". The reader generally cannot fail in this mission, regardless of his or her choices, although it is possible to get caught in an inescapable loop at one point.

Cameos
In the tribute anthology Foundations Friends, Harrison wrote a story, The Fourth Law of Robotics, which featured the Stainless Steel Rat in the setting of Isaac Asimov's  Robot series.

Board game
The Return of the Stainless Steel Rat, a board game inspired by the character, was published by SPI in their magazine Ares in the late 1970s. Designed by Greg Costikyan, the game involved the Rat infiltrating a space station under hostile control. The game was accompanied by a 6,000-word short story.

Video game
In 1984 a Stainless Steel Rat video game was developed by Mosaic Publishing for the Sinclair Spectrum, co-written by Harrison with programmer Sean O'Connell.

A text adventure game titled The Stainless Steel Rat Saves the World was released in 1984 for the Commodore 64.

Characters

Angelina diGriz
Angelina diGriz is a criminal mastermind much like the Rat, only less ethical and more willing to kill. As the Rat's first case for the Special Corps, he tracks Angelina down and ends up falling in love with her. After her capture, she undergoes psycho surgery (not to be mistaken for "psychic surgery") to lessen her homicidal tendencies and she also joins the Corps; during that time she begins a relationship with the Rat that ends with them marrying in the last trimester of her pregnancy. She later assists on many of the Rat's adventures, often providing advice and solutions that Jim himself is unable to see. While she is no longer a heartless killer, her suppressed homicidal tendencies occasionally come out, especially when she sees another woman in close proximity to her husband.

James and Bolivar diGriz
James and Bolivar diGriz are the twin sons of the Rat and Angelina. The Rat missed most of the first six years of their life because of his adventures in time (he briefly sees them as babies at the end of The Stainless Steel Rat's Revenge), but they share their father's attitudes and many of his skills. They end up marrying the same woman, who falls in love with both of them and gets herself duplicated into two identical women sharing one mind.

Harold Peters Inskipp
Harold Peters Inskipp is the director of the Special Corps and one of the most powerful men in the Galaxy. He recruits the Rat, but is frequently infuriated by his insubordinate attitude and tendency to go rogue – committing independent crimes for sheer enjoyment. The Special Corps is composed almost entirely of former criminals – Inskipp himself was a legendary fugitive known as "Inskipp the Uncatchable" before being recruited and eventually becoming the Corps's commander.

Professor Coypu
One of the few Special Corps members not taken from the criminal fraternity, Professor Coypu is a boffin who had developed a Time Helix device permitting time travel as well as a portal to alternate realities. He also has a great deal of general scientific knowledge, and sent a copy of his mind with the Rat on his excursion to the 20th century to enable Jim to build a time helix and return to his native time. The only descriptions given of Coypu are his prominent buck teeth - a trait he shares with his namesake, the coypu - and a large nose.

The Bishop
The Bishop was a master criminal on Bit O'Heaven, the Stainless Steel Rat's home planet. He was a lot less physical in his capers than Jim but undertook robberies, always leaving as his calling card a picture of the bishop chess piece. He retired from robbery before Jim was born, focusing instead on computer crime, and Jim only learned of his existence from a fellow prisoner while briefly in jail. Jim then contacted The Bishop by using his calling card in a robbery. As a result, The Bishop was forced out of retirement when he underestimated the police's computer security systems after running a check on Jim himself. The Bishop eventually became Jim's mentor and taught him a great deal about their trade, as well as a code of ethics. Eventually Jim and The Bishop had to leave Bit O'Heaven and on their first off-planet adventure The Bishop was killed. As a parting gift he left Jim a note that he signed with his real name, although the name is not revealed to the reader.

The Kekkonshiki
The Kekkonshiki, also known as "The Gray Men", are a human culture who initially prefer domination to coexistence. Their expertise lies in using technology to manipulate sentient minds, and they have manipulated both humans and aliens on a grand scale. Jim has experienced one of their techniques, in which the subject is convinced, via an implanted memory and faked surgical scars, that their hands were severed by an axe and then reattached while they were unconscious from the shock; he later becomes aware of their involvement in the alien invasion when he sees the same marks on the wrists of another prisoner. Jim has knowingly opposed them on two separate occasions (The Stainless Steel Rat's Revenge and The Stainless Steel Rat Wants You), but in the latter novel he is informed that he has in fact thwarted their plans twice already, making this their third encounter.  (An alternate reading of the text is that finding and infiltrating their homeworld, in the second half of the novel, is counted separately from stopping the alien invasion in the first half.) They live on a harsh, icy world, which forced them to eliminate all emotion from their culture. This society is completely patriarchal, with women being treated as nothing more than property. During Jim's interactions with Hanasu - a disgraced Kekkonshiki council leader - he persuades them to reinterpret their teachings, and they embark on a more peaceful co-existence with the rest of humanity. ("Kekkonshiki" is the romanization of the Japanese word for "Marriage Ceremony" 結婚式.  Also, while on their homeworld, Jim follows a technician into a room marked "Benjo", which turns out to be a bathroom; "Benjo" is Japanese for water closet/toilet.)

In popular culture
The MIT class ring, commonly referred to as "The Brass Rat", when cast in Celestrium (also known as jeweler's steel), is often referred to as "The Stainless Steel Rat". This could be seen as a reference to The Stainless Steel Rat series.

The Chinese activist Liu Di, writing under the screen name "Stainless Steel Rat" (不锈钢老鼠), became a high-profile symbol for democracy and free speech in China since her detention in November 2002. Her screen name is often translated as Stainless Steel Mouse.

In The Librarians episode "And the Happily Ever Afters", Flynn Carsen refers to Ezekiel Jones, a thief, "master of technologies" as the "Stainless Steel Rat".

In Obsidian's The Outer Worlds a side quest is titled "The Stainless Steel Rat" after The Stainless Steel Rat series

Reception
Galaxy reviewer Floyd C. Gale rated the first novel four stars out of five, saying "though pure entertainment, [it] underlines SF's role in providing speculative thought about potential problems."

Notes

References

External links
Stainless Steel Rat Series page on Official website
 

Series listing at SciFan

Literary characters introduced in 1957
Book series introduced in 1961
Male characters in literature
Science fiction book series
2000 AD comic strips
Novels by Harry Harrison
Fictional gentleman thieves
Fictional male martial artists
Fictional bank robbers
Picaresque novels
Fictional con artists
Comic science fiction novels